Marine Operational Training Group 81 (MOTG-81) was a  United States Marine Corps aviation training group that was established during World War II. Squadrons from MOTG-81 trained pilots, aircrew and ground crew on the PBJ-1 medium bomber.  The Marine Corps divested its medium bomber fleet immediately after the war and the Group was decommissioned in December 1945.

History
Operational Training Squadron 8 (OTS-8) was commissioned on February 1, 1943, at Marine Corps Air Station Cherry Point, North Carolina under the command of Colonel Karl S. Day. Its mission was to provide training for the Marine Corps’ PBJ pilots.  From June through December 1943, the squadron trained 141 pilots, 345 aircrew and 195 ground crewman.  The squadron transferred to Marine Corps Air Station Edenton on December 3, 1943, and on January 1, 1944, they were redesignated as Marine Operational Training Group 81 (MOTG-81).  The group returned to MCAS Cherry Point in January 1945 and remained there until the end of the war.

Squadrons

MOTS-811
Marine Training Squadron 811 (MTS-811) was commissioned on January 1, 1944, at MCAS Edenton. They were redesignated Marine Operational Training Squadron 811 on February 1, 1945, and transferred to MCAS Cherry Point later that month on February 23, 1945.  The squadron was decommissioned on September 10, 1945.

MOTS-812
Marine Training Squadron 812 (MTS-812) was commissioned on January 1, 1944, at MCAS Edenton.  They were redesignated Marine Operational Training Squadron 812 on February 1, 1945, and transferred to MCAS Cherry Point later that month on February 20, 1945.  The squadron was decommissioned on September 10, 1945.

MOTS-813
Marine Training Squadron 813 (MTS-813) was commissioned on January 1, 1944, at MCAS Edenton.  They were redesignated Marine Operational Training Squadron 813 on February 1, 1945, and transferred to MCAS Cherry Point later that month on February 19, 1945.  The squadron was decommissioned in November 1945.

MOTS-814
Marine Training Squadron 814 (MTS-814) was commissioned on January 1, 1944, at MCAS Edenton.  They were redesignated Marine Operational Training Squadron 814 on February 1, 1945, and transferred to MCAS Cherry Point later that month on February 17, 1945.  The squadron was decommissioned in November 1945.

See also

 United States Marine Corps Aviation
 List of United States Marine Corps aircraft groups
 List of decommissioned United States Marine Corps aircraft squadrons

References
Notes

Bibliography

Web

Tr
Inactive units of the United States Marine Corps